Henan or Yu cuisine is an umbrella term used to define the native cooking styles of the Henan province in China. Henan (河南, or Honan) is a province located in Central China and is often also referred to by the names Zhongzhou or Zhongyuan, which means ‘midland’. Being landlocked on all sides, the influence of localized culinary styles are plentiful to be observed in Henan Cuisine. It incorporates a blend of culinary styles from Jiangsu and Beijing, which gives it a unique mix of taste. Henan Cuisine is well known for its taste variety including a blend of sour, sweet, bitter, spicy and salty. There are a wide variety of Henan dishes, including Carp with Fried Noodles in Sweet and Sour Sauce, Grilled Head and Tail of Black Carp, Bianjing Roasted Duck, Stewed Noodles with Mutton, and Spicy Soup. Despite its mix of flavours within its culinary forms, Henan cuisine is not known to take them to the extreme. Rather, Henan cuisine is known for inducing a very moderate and balanced mix of flavours in its dishes. Henan has a long cultural history, which not only left us precious cultural relics and historical sites but also Henan cuisine. Henan is in the central part of China, so it is a fusion of the characteristics of both southern and northern, resulting in a unique local cuisine. Henan cuisine, also known as Yu cuisine, has the honor of being one of China's oldest and most traditional cooking styles. There are more than 50 kinds of cooking methods in preparing Henan cuisine. The history of the province shows its relation to the affinity towards food culture among the people of Henan, where the motive to bring together the different tastes from the north and the south to blend it into one dish.

History of Henan Cuisine 

The History of Henan Cuisine dates back to the late Xia Dynasty in the 21st to the 17th century BC. Within this period, the entirety of Henan Cuisine underwent rapid and robust changes to accommodate the different emerging culinary cultures from the surrounding regions. By the end of the Xia dynasty, there was an entire banquet system based on Henan dishes. By the time the Shang Dynasty began in the 17th century BC, Henan Cuisine was redesigned with the new seasoning including all different flavours to bring a more harmonious element to it. This formed the base for most of the later Chinese cuisines.

Afterward in the period of the Northern Song Dynasty (around 960 – 1127 AD), Henan Cuisine reached its zenith. With the establishment of the capital city in Kaifeng, Henan, there was an uprise in the invention of a variety of new snacks. With rapid growth and development in the frying skills of the people, there was a peaking of a rise in fried food as well. Around this time, Henan Cuisine was also beginning to be divided into five kinds of dishes based on social status and religious backgrounds. The dishes for the imperial courthouses were different from the ones found in high-class localities, markets, in the temples and those found in common folk households.

With the fall of the Southern Song Dynasty around 1170 – 1180 AD, there was a decline in the quality and nature of the Henan cuisine. It was evident that the imperial stronghold was significant for the Henan Cuisine to survive and without the strength of the dynasty, the hierarchical structure for Henan cuisine started to break down. Later, basing on the original Henan Culinary style followed in the imperial courts, high class families, markets, temples and households, a mixed blend of contemporary Henan Cuisine was developed. Much like the nature of its flavours – harmony in terms of social status was also shown to be a diversifying feature of the Henan Cuisine. The mixed blend of Henan Cuisine as developed, gradually evolved into what it is like today. Over time, the contact with the nearby regions on all sides, especially with Beijing on the North and the influence from the Jiangsu Culinary styles poured over to the Henan Cuisine styles and helped it evolve into what it is like today.

Cultural Relevance of Henan Cuisine 
Chinese Cuisine is normally quire intricately linked with the culture of the place it is from. Henan Cuisine too is not so different, as it embraces the notion of mean and harmony in most of its cuisines. Given that Henan is an entirely landlocked province, the influence from the neighbouring regions are quite evident in the culture of the province, as much as it is evident in the culinary styles and dishes. One feature that is evident in the constantly evolving Henan Cuisines is the use of animal fat. Previously, animal fat was frequently used in Henan cuisine to fry foods, but given partly the influence of neighbouring regions and partly the influence of the growing health concerns, it is slowly seeing a decline.

Chinese culture and Chinese cuisine have always been the subject of awe for the western world due to its precision, and the way each ingredient is utilized in the dish being specific makes it appealing to them. China has been stepping out of the shadow of the western world and has managed to create an identity of their own, and Henan is one of the oldest provinces of China, which has evolved merging the important food cultures of surrounding regions. Henan is English for Huang He in Chinese, which is translated to ‘south of the Yellow River’. The location of the province is in the middle of the four ancient capitals of the country namely: Anyang, Zhengzhou, Luoyang, and Kaifeng. It is one of the largest provinces in terms of area and is also considered as the originating place of the Chinese style of cooking. The cuisine is known by various names due to being used under different dynasties such as Yu cuisine and Zhongyuan. The province has been surrounded by regions from all sides shows the collaboration of the cooking style and culinary adherence and adaptation from them, which makes an exquisite style. However, there has been disagreement among the Hans Chinese relating to the originating style of the cuisine because the province always been a political and economic center in the past, making it almost impossible to trace the historical development of the cuisine. The name Yu cuisine is referred to the style which they employ to cook specific dishes of the cuisine, which are the trademark style. The method of cooking is based on a variety of techniques and is taken from the province from which the dish is related.

Characteristics of Henan Cuisine 
Apart from sharing similarities with the Jiangsu cuisine in terms of the extremeness of flavour, Henan Cuisine has some specific features and characteristics for identification. Some of them are as follows:

 Henan cuisine employs the use of a lot of onions. It can be said that onions are a staple part of Henan culinary form. 
 Henan cuisine serves different meat for different dishes. The principal meat used in Henan Cuisine is pork, but it is not often served in soups. For soups, the primary choice is restricted to mutton and lamb. 
 Like other parts of northern China, the staple crop in most of Henan is wheat, and wheat-based products like shaobing are commonly consumed.

Thoughts of Henan Cuisine 
The food culture of a geographical location is frequently found to be influenced by the social, political, and economic factors, and the development involved in all three sectors together combines to form grounds on which the cuisines are built. Another essential factor that contributes to the cuisine and its formation is due to the food crop and raw material found in the region. The staple food of a location is found to be the base on which the cuisine is modified and structured. China is one of the most diversified of the eastern world, and its geographical location has come to the forefront. It is utilized by the tourism industry to boost their economic grasp. The empirical data shows that the popularity of the cuisine also depends on its exposure outside its originating areas, and it shapes the outcome regarding the health issue of the region as well.

The most significant feature of the cuisine arises because of the overlapping method of cooking, which is adapted from Beijing and Jiangsu cuisine and that gives it a very distinct texture and is dependent on the seasonal food. However, the style adopted by Henan cuisine resembles more to that of Jiangsu and is mostly lighter in taste. The most common food material used in terms of meat is pork and is used along with animal fat in most of the dushes. The combined form of the cuisine is achieved with the Yu style of cooking, where many methods such as boiling, stewing, steaming, frying as well deep frying, and along with it, most of the dishes were served with thick sauces made from scratch.

Traditional Henan Dishes 
Various dishes are considered to represent the traditional style of Henan cuisine; however, their popularity depends on the way they are received in society. One of the most significant dishes involves making bread and is known as Wuxiang shaobing, which is a five-spiced bread and is served with pork meat cooked in several ways. Some of the traditional dishes include soups such as Hu La Soup and Luoyang Water Banquet. It is also noticed that there is a mix in the use of meat in the case of the traditional Kaifeng Tai Si Bao, which is made by stuffing one bird into a bigger one, and then they are glazed with animal fats and steamed along with vegetables. It is served as a main course along with loaves of bread. The dish is used as a side dish for the main course and is often found in all the traditional restaurants of Henan. Another great recipe which is served and treated to the guest in Henan province includes Luoyang Water Banquet which is a soup and involves an intricate and exquisite cooking technique in which the egg slices are carved in the shape of the peony flower which is a local favorite in the capital city of Zhengzhou.

Carp on Noodles is another main dish which has been adopted from the Kaifeng cuisine and is served along with sweet and sour soup with the steamed carp covered and deep-fired with noodles. One of the dishes which is traditional and is available in the selected few restaurants only known as Jiao Hua Ji. It is an intriguing dish as it prepared after the chicken is covered with mud and is then roasted. If the roasted is not opened, the chicken tends to last for at least two days. It also signifies the cooking skills of the people in ancient China and how they manage to cook their meat in the absence of utensils. Bianjing Roasted Duck and Grilled Head and tail of Black Carp are two dishes that show the prevalence of sweet and sour taste in cooked meat.

Famous Henan Restaurants 

 Rocky's Diner
 You Le ZiDong Restaurant
 Henan Cuisine and Opera
 Hilton Zhengzhou
 ZAX BBQ
 Speed Bar
 Bowango Restaurant
 Henan Food House

Conclusion 
Henan dishes contain many tastes, such as sour, bitter, sweet, spicy, and salty. Henan cuisine had a fascinating background, and then-Prime Minister Yiyin, who is regarded as the originator of Chinese cooking, wanted to season the Henan food with all the tastes. Henan cuisines focused on the mean and harmony principle, rather than on a single flavor. The spirit of Henan cuisine equals to the spirit of Henan people. It needs to be stated that Henan cuisine one a whole takes the entire approach of mixed cooking and adds significant cultural elements in it. For instance, looking at the geography of the place, Henan cuisine adds the concept of cultural mixing through harmony between the flavours used. That is why Henan cuisine is so different from its Beijing counterpart. Secondly, Henan cuisine, much like its provincial counterparts, also has its roots in the history of the country. Dating back to the 21st century B.C., Henan Cuisine has seen a lot of significant changes over time. Instead of ridding the dishes of these changes, the culinary style has embraced the nuances and given rise to what the modern Henan cuisine is. Thus, at the core, of its essence, Henan cuisine is as much a culinary form as it is a reflection of the culture and history of the place.

References

Regional cuisines of China